The 1904 Arizona football team was an American football team that represented the University of Arizona as independent during the 1904 college football season. In its second season under head coach Orin A. Kates, the team compiled a 3–1–2 record and outscored opponents by a total of 66 to 48. The team captain was Burrell R. Hatcher.

Schedule

References

Arizona
Arizona Wildcats football seasons
Arizona football